Arthur Banner (28 June 1918 – April 1980) was an English footballer who played as a defender for Doncaster Rovers, West Ham United, Leyton Orient and Sittingbourne where he was also the player-manager.

Playing career

Doncaster Rovers
Born in Sheffield, Banner started his football career with Doncaster Rovers where he made no league appearances but played 4 games in the Division 3 North Challenge Cup where Rovers lost in extra time in the semi-final. At the end of the season, he moved to West Ham United in exchange for Fred Dell and Albert Walker.

West Ham United
In his first season at West Ham in 1938, Banner played just one Football League game, a 2–0 home win against Southampton on 22 April 1939, before the outbreak of World War II. During the war, Banner served in the Essex Regiment and the Royal Artillery rising to the rank of sergeant. He continued to play for West Ham during the war and after it ended played 26 more games before moving to Leyton Orient in February 1948.

Management
He later became player-manager of Sittingbourne and was coach to Ilford when they reached the FA Amateur Cup in 1958 which they lost 3–0 to Woking.

Banner died in Thorpe Bay in Essex in April 1980.

References

1918 births
1980 deaths
Military personnel from Sheffield
Footballers from Sheffield
English footballers
English Football League players
Doncaster Rovers F.C. players
West Ham United F.C. players
Leyton Orient F.C. players
Sittingbourne F.C. players
Association football defenders
Southern Football League players
West Ham United F.C. wartime guest players
Doncaster Rovers F.C. wartime guest players
English football managers
Sittingbourne F.C. managers
Ilford F.C. managers
Southern Football League managers
Essex Regiment soldiers
Royal Artillery soldiers
British Army personnel of World War II
Brentford F.C. wartime guest players